Mahmudia is a commune in Tulcea County, Northern Dobruja, Romania. It is composed of a single village, Mahmudia. It included the villages of Beștepe, Băltenii de Jos and Băltenii de Sus until 2004, when these were split off to form Beștepe Commune.

Natives
Dumitru Alexe
Gheorghe Calciu-Dumitreasa

References

Communes in Tulcea County
Localities in Northern Dobruja
Place names of Turkish origin in Romania